Wilson Warehouse is a historic combined dwelling, warehouse, and store building located at Buchanan, Botetourt County, Virginia. It was built in 1839, and is a two-story, six bay, brick building in the Greek Revival style. It measures 54 feet by 48 feet

It was listed on the National Register of Historic Places in 1978.

References

External links
Wilson Warehouse, Lowe & Washington Streets, Buchanan, Botetourt County, VA: 1 photo and 1 photo caption page at Historic American Buildings Survey

Historic American Buildings Survey in Virginia
Commercial buildings on the National Register of Historic Places in Virginia
Greek Revival houses in Virginia
Commercial buildings completed in 1839
Buildings and structures in Botetourt County, Virginia
National Register of Historic Places in Botetourt County, Virginia
Warehouses on the National Register of Historic Places
1839 establishments in Virginia